Miss World 1982, the 32nd edition of the Miss World pageant, was held on 18 November 1982 at the Royal Albert Hall in London, UK. The winner was Mariasela Álvarez from the Dominican Republic. She was crowned by Miss World 1981, Pilín León of Venezuela. The first and second runners-up were Sari Kaarina Aspholm from Finland and Della Dolan from the United Kingdom who were semi-finalists in Miss Universe 1982 four months before.

Results

Placements

Continental Queens of Beauty

Contestants

Notes

Debuts

Returns

Last competed in 1975:
 
Last competed in 1979:
 
Last competed in 1980:
 
 
  (as Virgin Islands)

Withdrawals
  – Because of ongoing political conflict with the United Kingdom, pertaining to the dispute in the Falkland Islands.
  – Rita Isabelle Zehtner (personal reasons)

Other Notes
 ''' Sari Kaarina Aspholm from Finland and Della Dolan from the United Kingdom who were semi-finalists in Miss Universe 1982 four months before.

References

External links
 Pageantopolis – Miss World 1982

Miss World
1982 in London
1982 beauty pageants
Beauty pageants in the United Kingdom
Events at the Royal Albert Hall
November 1982 events in the United Kingdom